The Rednitz is a  long river in Franconia, Germany, tributary of the Regnitz (more precisely: its southern, left headstream). The Rednitz is formed by the confluence of the rivers Franconian Rezat and Swabian Rezat, in Georgensgmünd (district of Roth). The Rednitz flows north through Roth bei Nürnberg, Schwabach and the southwestern quarters of Nuremberg. The Rednitz joins the Pegnitz to form the Regnitz in Fürth.

Sources 
Franz X. Bogner: Rednitz und Regnitz. Eine Luftbildreise von Weißenburg bis Bamberg. Luftbildband. Verlag Fränkischer Tag, Bamberg 2007

See also
List of rivers of Bavaria

References

 
Rivers of Bavaria
Rivers of Germany